Ionas Sautra is a Soviet sprint canoer who competed in the late 1970s. He won two medals at the 1979 ICF Canoe Sprint World Championships in Duisburg with a silver in the K-4 500 m and a bronze in the K-4 1000 m events.

References

Living people
Soviet male canoeists
Year of birth missing (living people)
Russian male canoeists
ICF Canoe Sprint World Championships medalists in kayak